In enzymology, a guanidinoacetate kinase is an enzyme that catalyzes the chemical reaction

ATP + guanidinoacetate  ADP + phosphoguanidinoacetate

Thus, the two substrates of this enzyme are ATP and guanidinoacetate, whereas its two products are ADP and phosphoguanidinoacetate.

Guanidinoacetate kinase belongs to the family of transferases, specifically those that transfer phosphorus-containing groups (phosphotransferases) with a nitrogenous group as acceptor.  The systematic name of this enzyme class is ATP:guanidinoacetate N-phosphotransferase. This enzyme is also called glycocyamine kinase.  This enzyme participates in arginine and proline metabolism.

References

 
 
 
 

EC 2.7.3
Enzymes of unknown structure